Het Leugenpaleis (English: The Palace of Lies) was a Flemish (Belgian) radio sketch comedy show by Hugo Matthysen and Bart Peeters, presented from 1988 until 1999 on radio station Studio Brussel. At the time it enjoyed a huge cult following.

The absurd comedy show proved popular enough to inspire two television spin-offs, "De Liegende Doos" (1995) and "Het Peulengaleis" (1999-2005).

Concept

"Het Leugenpaleis" was a completely improvised radio sketch show, presented by TV presenter Bart Peeters and writer Hugo Matthysen. Most of the comedy came from the hosts playing bizarre and silly characters who reappeared in every episode. The nonsensical atmosphere was highlighted by the fact that both Peeters and Matthysen often starting corpsing, sometimes to the point that they were unable to continue for a few minutes.

Each episode closed with The Great Gig in the Sky by Pink Floyd and Lara's Theme by Maurice Jarre.

Characters

The show had a series of memorable characters, some of which were also used in the TV show adaptations. Apart from these recurring characters Peeters and Matthysen also enjoyed playing fictitious versions of real-life Flemish celebrities, such as The Paranoiacs, Daan Stuyven, Stef Kamil Carlens, Cas Goossens, Mark Coenen, Kathleen Cools and cardinal Godfried Danneels. They usually didn't bother with the accent or any sense of reality at all.

History

"Het Leugenpaleis" aired on Studio Brussel from 1988  to 1999. Right from the start it divided listeners in two camps: you either loved it or hated it. Peeters and Matthysen's unprofessional attitude often caused them to start laughing halfway their performances or made skits go on for so long that the musical interludes had to wait. Originally radio network chief Jan Schoukens planned to fire them, but since the airings had garnered a cult following by then the show was allowed to stay in the air.

In 1989 the show won the HA! van Humo, an annual prize for best Flemish TV show, awarded by the Flemish magazine Humo. It is still the only radio show so far to be awarded this TV prize.

The show ended in 1999, but in 2005 it returned for one final episode to celebrate the 75th anniversary of Belgian radio.

Television adaptations

In 1993 Bart Peeters appeared in Mark Uytterhoeven's popular TV talk show "Morgen Maandag", where he played BRTN network head Cas Goossens, whom he had imitated a lot in "Het Leugenpaleis". It was one of the most memorable moments of the show.

De (V)liegende doos

In 1995 Peeters and Matthysen tried to transfer the absurd Leugenpaleis comedy to television. Since the BRTN refused to give them their own show at the time they broadcast the format on the commercial network vtm. The shows, "De Vliegende Doos" and "De Liegende Doos" ("The Flying Box" and "The Lying Box") were broadcast in prime time at Sunday evenings. "De Vliegende Doos" was a big budget comedy musical spectacle show aimed at a family audience, with puppets and Ronny Mosuse playing an African warrior. "De Liegende Doos" was broadcast later at night and more adult in style. Both programs went live and were completely improvised. While the shows received a lot of media attention at the time the format didn't really catch on with the general public. "De Vliegende Doos" was perceived to be too infantile. "De Liegende Doos", which was more in line with the madcap style of the radio show, got a better reception, but was still too daft for the average viewer. Still, "De Vliegende Doos" was shown in repeats during vtm and its sister channel 2BE's matinée hours and a CD with music from the show was released later.

Het Peulengaleis

Four years later Peeters and Matthysen returned to the small screen with "Het Peulengaleis", a switcheroo of the radio show's title. This time the VRT did give them a chance to make a TV version of "Het Leugenpaleis" and it aired on Canvas late at night. Each episode was directed by Stijn Coninx and featured, apart from Peeters and Matthysen, guest actors among which Tine Embrechts was the most prominent.

The show was smaller in budget and pretense and reached its target audience much easier. It was an instant hit and popular enough to inspire six TV seasons.

Availability
In the 1980s and 1990s memorable moments from the radio show were compiled on cassette tapes and CDs. In 2006 a double compilation CD was released.

In popular culture

The Belgian comedy rock band The Clement Peerens Explosition is based on the character Clement Peerens. The band stars Hugo Matthysen as the character, with Bart Peeters and Ronny Mosuse as fellow band members.

A restaurant in Sint Niklaas was named after the show.

In 2007 the Leugenpaleis sketch "De Floeren Portemonee" was elected as the funniest radio comedy moment in Flemish radio history in a poll held by Radio 1.

Sources

Belgian comedy radio programs
1988 radio programme debuts
1999 radio programme endings
Radio programs adapted into television shows
Radio sketch shows
Surreal comedy radio series